Belsize is a hamlet in Sarratt civil parish, Three Rivers District, Hertfordshire, England, situated less than a mile from Chipperfield and Sarratt.

Belsize was given the award of Hertfordshire's best-kept hamlet in both 1989 and 1996.

References

External links

Hamlets in Hertfordshire
Dacorum